Laxman Sangappa Savadi (16 February 1960) is an Indian politician who is currently serving as the Member of Karnataka Legislative Council from 17 February 2020. He served as the 8th Deputy Chief Minister of Karnataka and Minister of Transport of Karnataka, from 20 August 2019 to 28 July 2021, in the Fourth BS Yediyurappa ministry. He was Deputy Leader of the House in Karnataka Legislative Council. He had served as the Minister  for Cooperation in the Second B.S.Yeddurappa Ministry and D. V. Sadananda Gowda Government. He was elected to the legislative assembly from Athani constituency in 2004, 2008 and 2013 as a BJP candidate. On 20 August 2019 he was inducted as the Cabinet Minister in Bharatiya Janata Party (BJP) government led by Chief Minister B. S. Yeddyurappa.
On 17 February 2020 he was elected as an MLC by securing 113 votes out of the 120 votes polled.

He resigned as a Minister on 8 February 2012 during the Karnataka video clip controversy.

References

Bharatiya Janata Party politicians from Karnataka
Living people
 State cabinet ministers of Karnataka
 Karnataka MLAs 2013–2018
 Deputy Chief Ministers of Karnataka
1960 births